Stansted was a rural district in Essex, England from  to .

It was created under the Local Government Act 1894 from the part of the Bishop's Stortford rural sanitary district which was in Essex (the rest becoming Bishop's Stortford Rural District in Hertfordshire).

It consisted of the following parishes

Berden
Birchanger
Elsenham
Farnham
Great Hallingbury
Henham
Little Hallingbury
Manuden
Stansted Mountfitchet
Ugley

The district was wound up in 1934 under a County Review Order.  The Hallingburys became part of Dunmow Rural District with the rest of the district joining Saffron Walden Rural District.  Since 1974 it has formed part of the district of Uttlesford.

References
http://www.visionofbritain.org.uk/relationships.jsp?u_id=10055027

Districts of England created by the Local Government Act 1894
History of Essex
Rural districts of England